Gregor Bailar (born May 3, 1963) is a US technology executive, professional director, and philanthropist who held executive roles at Citibank, NASDAQ and Capital One. He managed technology and operations for the NASDAQ Stock Market during the dot-com boom and tragedy of 9/11. He led rescue operations during Katrina and the Beltway Sniper for Capital One. He has been cited as one of the most influential CIOs of the internet age and was inducted into the CIO Hall of Fame in 2007.

Early life 
Bailar grew up in Miami, FL and was an honor student at South Miami High School, president of the Dade County Association of Student Government Presidents and active in debate, drama and the math club. Bailar is a graduate of Dartmouth College with a BA in Electrical Engineering and Computer Science.

Business and technology roles 
Bailar worked at HP, NeXT Computer, Perot Systems, Citicorp, NASDAQ and Capital One. He has served on a variety of for-profit and non-profit boards including Digitas, Inc., Endurance Specialty Holdings and The Corporate Executive Board (now a part of Gartner Group), where he was Chairman of the Audit Committee. Bailar's seats on non-profit boards include The National Wildlife Federation and adviser to GirlRising. While at NASD/NASDAQ, Bailar oversaw the renovation of the NASDAQ market systems during the dot.com boom.

Accolades 
Bailar was inducted into the CIO Hall of Fame by CIO Magazine. While at Capital One, Bailar scored first place in the Information Week 500 ranking of the top users of technology. His workplace automation concepts have been studied and adopted widely in the industry. Forbes Magazine notes that Bailar was "One of the first board-level CIOs." Bailar was an early adotper of agile development in both business and government.  In 2012, he assisted the GAO with their report on effective software development practices - including agile development. Bailar was profiled as the "Indiana Jones of IT" by Computer World  and has been cited for sourcing approaches.

Disaster response and risk management 
While CIO and head of Operations for the NASDAQ Stock Market in 2001, Bailar assisted with the recovery of the US financial markets after the 9/11 terrorist attacks. Bailar's response to the events of 9/11 was historic beyond the impact of the events themselves. The story of his actions was also the first time a story about a CIO's rapid response to events had been published on the Internet before it was reported in print. In 2000, at NASDAQ, Bailar was a key force in the financial markets' remediation of the "Y2K bug." In 2002, Bailar oversaw Capital One's technology team's response to Anthrax scares in DC. Bailar was CIO and a member of the Executive Committee for Capital One during Katrina and was named to the honor roll of first respondents aiding in recovery from the hurricane. Peter High comments in his book World Class IT that Bailar was involved in "some of the most famous American disasters of the 2000s.

Publications 
 Co-inventor, US patent 20050234769: System and method for providing personalized assistance using a financial card having an RFID device.
 A history of the Internet and the Digital Future. Ryan, Johnny. Reaktion Books, 2010.
 Competing with analytics. Davenport, Thomas A. 2007.
 Using Data Sharing to Improve Coordination in Peacebuilding. National Academy of Engineering and United States Institute of Peace. 2012.
 World Class IT: Why Businesses Succeed When IT Triumphs. High, Peter A. 2009.

References

Living people
1963 births
Dartmouth College alumni
Chief information officers
American computer businesspeople
People from Miami